Achante Bharya is a 1971 Indian Malayalam-language film directed and produced by Thikkurissy Sukumaran Nair. It is a remake of the Tamil film Chitthi. The film stars Adoor Bhasi, K. P. Ummer, Ragini and Thikkurissy Sukumaran Nair. It was released on 23 July 1971.

Plot

Cast 

Adoor Bhasi as Contractor Karunakaran Nair
K. P. Ummer as Vijayan
Ragini as Thangamma
Thikkurissy Sukumaran Nair
Jose Prakash as Rajan
Sindhu
Baby Bindu
Baby Indira
Baby Shanthi
Baby Uma
Baby Vijaya
Bahadoor as Balan Nair
Kayyalam
Master Raju
Meena as Adoor Bhasi's Mother
Menon
Nellikode Bhaskaran as Thikkurissi's Son
Pala Thankam as Ragini's Mother
Vijayasree as Omana

Soundtrack 
The music was composed by V. Dakshinamoorthy and the lyrics were written by Thikkurissy Sukumaran Nair and Irayimman Thampi.

References

External links 
 

1970s Malayalam-language films
1971 films
Films based on adaptations
Films directed by Thikkurissy Sukumaran Nair
Malayalam remakes of Tamil films